Blue-green is the color that is between green and blue. It belongs to the cyan family of colors.

Variations

Cyan (aqua)

Cyan, also called aqua, is the blue-green color that is between blue and green on a modern RGB color wheel.

The modern RGB color wheel replaced the traditional old-fashioned RYB color wheel because it is possible to display much brighter and more saturated colors using the primary and secondary colors of the RGB color wheel. In the terminology of color theory, RGB color space has a much larger color gamut than RYB color space.

The first recorded use of cyan as a color name in English was in 1879.

Turquoise

The color turquoise, a representation of the color of the semi-precious stone turquoise.

The first recorded use of turquoise as a color name in English was in 1573.

The color "turquoise" is a light tone of blue-green.

Green-blue

Green-blue was a Crayola crayon color from 1958 to 1990.

Bondi Blue

Bondi blue is a color belonging to the cyan family of blues. It is very similar to the Crayola crayon color "blue-green".

Apple, Inc. christened the color of the back of the original iMac computer "Bondi Blue" when it was introduced in 1998. It is said to be named for the color of the water at Bondi Beach, in Sydney, Australia.

Blue green (Munsell)

One definition of the color is in the Munsell color system (Munsell 5BG) although there is wide-spread acceptance and knowledge of the colour from the so called blue-green algae which have been recognised and described since the 18th century and probably before that.

Cerulean

Teal

In nature

Bacteria
 Blue-green algae are a phylum of bacteria that obtain their energy through photosynthesis.
Fish
 The blue green damselfish is a species of damselfish.
Lakes
 Glacial flour, powdered rock, can turn a lake to a blue-green color.

In human culture
Linguistics

 In some languages, blue and green are considered a single color.

Religion

 In the iconography of the Virgin of Guadalupe, she is often depicted as wearing a blue-green colored robe.  The color is significant to the Mexicas because in the Aztec religion. Also, Blue-green is known as Maya blue in pre-Columbian cultures. In the Nahuatl culture blue represents the center of fire and tonalli. Also sometimes the blue color is diluted so it appears as a turquoise on manuscripts. The color is often used for the representation of Aztec rulers and European kings.

Politics

Variations of blue-green are the political colours (or one of the political colours) of various political parties, including:
New Right (Denmark)
DENK (The Netherlands)
Brexit Party/Reform UK (United Kingdom)
People-Animals-Nature (Portugal)
Justice Party (United States)
In Australia, a loosely-aligned group of independent and minor party candidates that ran in the 2022 Australian federal election were called teal independents for their blend of green and blue (Liberal) politics.

See also
List of colors

References

Shades of cyan
Shades of blue
Shades of green